The Roman Catholic Diocese of Poreč and Pula (Italian: Diocesi di Parenzo e Pola) is a suffragan Latin diocese in the Ecclesiastical province of the Metropolitan Archdiocese of Rijeka on Istria peninsula, in Croatia.

Special churches 

The cathedral episcopal see is Euphrasian Basilica, a Minor basilica and World Heritage Site in the city of Poreč. The Co-Cathedral is Cathedral of the Assumption of the Blessed Virgin Mary in Pula. There are two more former cathedrals: Crkva Sv. Pelagije, in Novigrad, and 
Crkva Navještenja BDM, in Pićan.

History 
 Established circa (200-)300 as Diocese of Parentium; medieval/modern names Poreč (Croat) / Parenzo (Italian) / Parentin(us) (Latin adjective)
 Exchanged territory in 1784 with the Italian Diocese of Trieste
 Formally United aeque principaliter (i.e. in personal union) with the Diocese of Cittanova but only 1442–1448
 Renamed on June 30, 1828 as Diocese of Parenzo/Poreč and Pola/Pula, having gained territory from the suppressed Diocese of Pula
 Gained territory on 1977.10.17 from the Diocese of Trieste, and exchanged territory with Diocese of Koper.

Statistics 
As per 2014, it pastorally served 169,048 Catholics (79.5% of 212,561 total) on 2,839 km² in 135 parishes with 108 priests (94 diocesan, 14 religious), 1 deacon, 78 lay religious (48 brothers, 30 sisters) and 6 seminarians.

Episcopal ordinaries
(all Roman rite; probably many Italians, notably in the early centuries)

Suffragan Bishops of Poreč 
 Andrea (991 – 1010?)
 Sigimbaldo (1015 – 1017?)
 Engelmaro (1028 – 1040)
 Arpo (1045 – 1050)
 Orso (1050 – 1060)
 Adelman (1060 – 1075)
 Cadolo (1075 – 1082)
 Pagano I (1082 – 1104)
 Bertold (1104 – 1120)
 Ferongo (1120 – 1131)
 Rodemondo (1131 – 1146)
 Vincenzo (1146 – 1158)
 Uberto (1158 – 1174)
 Pietro (1174 – 1194)
 Giovanni I (1196 – 1200)
 Pulcherio (1200 – 1216?)
 Adalberto (1219 – 1243)
 Pagano II  (1243 – 1246)
 Giovanni II (1249 – 1254)
 Ottone (1256 – 1282)
 Bonifazio (1282 – 1305)
 Giuliano Natale (1306 – 1309)
 Graziadio, Carmelite Order (O. Carm.) (1309 – 1327)
 Giovanni Gottoli de Sordello, Dominican Order (O.P.) (1328.06.20 – death 1367)
 Gilberto Zorzi, O.P. (1367.07.02 – 1388.03.04), next Bishop of Eraclea (1388.03.04 – death 1403)
 Giovanni Lombardo, O. Carm. (1388.06 – death 1415.03.21)
 Fantino Valaresso (1415.04.28 – 1425.12.05), later Metropolitan Archbishop of Crete (insular Greece) (1425.12.05 – death 1443.05.18)
 Daniele Scotto de’ Rampi (1426 – 1433), next Bishop of Concordia (Italy) (1433.01.07 – death 1443.07.11)
 Angelo Cavazza (1433.01.07 – 1440.04.11); previously Bishop of Arba (1433.01.07 – 1440.04.11); later Bishop of Cittanova (1442 – retired 1448); died 1457 
 Placido de Pavanello, Vallombrosians (O.S.B. Vall.) (1457.01.24 – 1464.11.05); previously Titular Bishop of Byblus (1454.01.09 – 1457.01.24); later Bishop of Torcello (1464.11.05 – 1471)
 Francesco Morosini, Benedictine Order (O.S.B.)  (1464.11.14 – death 1470.10.03), also Apostolic Administrator of Macerata (Italy) (1470.02.02 – 1470.10.03) and Apostolic Administrator of Roman Catholic Diocese of Recanati&Recanati (Italy) (1470.02.02 – 1470.10.03)
 
 ... 
TO BE COMPLETED/ELABORATED 
 Apostolic Administrator Cardinal Lorenzo Campeggio (1533.06.06 – 1537.05.28)
 ...

Suffragan Bishops of Poreč and Pula 
TO BE ELABORATED 
 Juraj Dobrila (1857.12.21 – 1875)
 Giovanni Nepomuceno Glavina (1878.09.13 – 1882.07.03)
 Alojzij Zorn (1882.09.25 – 1883.08.09)
 Giovanni Battista Flapp (1884.11.13 – 1912)
 Trifone Pederzolli (1913.06.19 – 1941.04.22)
 Raffaele Mario Radossi, O.F.M. Conv. (1941.11.27 – 1948.07.07)
 Apostolic Administrator Bishop Dragutin Nežić (1950.05.21 – 1960.06.15)
  Bishop Dragutin Nežić (1960.06.15 – 1984.01.27)
  Bishop Antun Bogetić (1984.01.27 – 1997.11.18)
  Bishop Ivan Milovan (1997.11.18 - 2012.06.14)
  Bishop Dražen Kutleša (since 2012.06.14)

See also 

 Roman Catholicism in Croatia
 Istria County
 History of Istria

Sources and external links 
 Diocese website (in Croat)

References

Roman Catholic dioceses in Croatia
Dioceses established in the 3rd century